The Glass City Classic was a golf tournament on the LPGA Tour, played only in 1966. It was played at the Highland Meadows Golf Club in Sylvania, Ohio. Sandra Haynie won the event in a sudden-death playoff over Gloria Ehret.

See also
Jamie Farr Toledo Classic: a LPGA Tour event that has been played at Highland Meadows Golf Club since 1989.

References

External links
Results at golfobserver.com
Highland Meadows Golf Club

Former LPGA Tour events
Golf in Ohio
Sports in Toledo, Ohio
1966 establishments in Ohio
1966 disestablishments in Ohio
Sports competitions in Ohio
History of women in Ohio